Park Doo-shik (born 1 January 1988) is a South Korean actor. He is known for his main roles in movie Gangsters (2019) and dramas such as Drama Stage Season 2: All About My Rival in Love, Heroes (2015). Park also appeared in the famous and popular drama of School series, Who Are You: School 2015 as Kwon Gi Tae.

Filmography

Television

Web series

Film

Awards and nominations
Nomination - Best New Actor - Park Doo-sik

References

External links 

Profile (naver)

1988 births
Living people
People from Incheon
21st-century South Korean male actors
South Korean male models
South Korean male television actors
South Korean male film actors